"My Heart Is Broken in Three" is a song written by Ray Glaser (or Glasser)

Slim Whitman released it as a single (Imperial 8169, with "Keep It a Secret" on the opposite side) in 1952.

In the UK, the song was originally released coupled with "Cold Empty Arms" (London L 1206, 1952) and some years later chosen as the filp side to "I'm a Fool" (London HL 8252, 1956).

Track listing

Spade Cooley version 
Spade Cooley released his version on Decca (cat. no. 46376, with "The Cowboy Waltz" on the flip side) in 1951.

Charts

References 

1952 songs
1952 singles
Imperial Records singles
Slim Whitman songs